The Ometo languages of Ethiopia are a dialect cluster of the Omotic family, generally accepted as part of the Afro-Asiatic language family. They include the most populous Omotic language, Wolaytta, with two million speakers. The languages have around 4 million speakers.

Classification

Bender (2000)
Bender (2000) classifies them as,

South: Maale
Basketo
Central: Wolaytta (Ometo), Oyda (Oyta), Melo (Malo), Dorze–Gamo-Gofa-Dawro
East: Gats'ame (Kachama-Ganjule), Koorete (Koyra, Harro), Zayse-Zergulla

Blench (2006)
Hayward (2003) added Basketo to Central Ometo and called the result 'North Ometo', a position followed by Blench (2006).

Blench (2006) lists several additional North Ometo languages, and lists Chara as unclassified within the family.

North: Misketto (Basketto), Dokka, Doko-Dolo, Wolaitta (Welamo), Zala, Oyda, Malo, Dorze–Laha–Gamo–Gofa–Kullo-Konta–Dache, Ganjule, Gidicho, Kachama
East: Gatame (Haruro), Zayse (+Zergula), Koore/Koyra (Badittu)
South: Maale
?: Ch'ara

He also lists Balta, a regional name for Wolaytta, as a possibly separate language.

Notes 

North Omotic languages
Languages of Ethiopia